The Théâtre du Nouveau Monde (TNM) is a theatre company and venue located on rue Sainte-Catherine in Montreal, Quebec.

Initially located at the Gesù (1951–1958), it subsequently moved to the Orpheum, then after 1966 it transferred to the salle Port-Royal at Place des Arts and remained there until 1972.

In 1972, the TNM bought the building where the Gayety Theatre and later the Théâtre de la Comédie-Canadienne once performed. The building was renovated in 1997 by Montreal architect Dan Hanganu.

Founders 
Jean-Louis Roux
Jean Gascon
Guy Hoffmann
Georges Groulx
Robert Gadouas
Éloi de Grandmont

Directors 
Jean Gascon (1951–1966) 
Jean-Louis Roux (1966–1982)
André Pagé (1981)
Olivier Reichenbach (1982–1992)
Lorraine Pintal (1992-)

See also  
 Théâtre du Rideau Vert
 Compagnons de Saint-Laurent

References

External links 

Fonds du Théâtre du nouveau monde (MSS3) at Bibliothèque et Archives nationales du Québec
Théâtre du Nouveau Monde fonds (R2343) at Library and Archives Canada. The fonds contains 6 prints.

Theatres in Montreal
1951 establishments in Quebec
Performing groups established in 1951
Dan Hanganu buildings
Quartier des spectacles